Morgan Pressel (born May 23, 1988) is an American professional golfer and golf commentator who played on the LPGA Tour. In 2001, as a 12-year-old, she became the youngest player to qualify for the U.S. Women's Open. She was the 2005 American Junior Golf Association (AJGA) Player of the Year, and won the 2006 AJGA Nancy Lopez Award. She turned pro at age 17, and is the youngest-ever winner of a modern LPGA major championship, when at age 18 she won the 2007 Kraft Nabisco Championship (now known as the ANA Inspiration) and vaulted to a career-high fourth in the world rankings. In early March 2021, she announced she had joined the Golf Channel and NBC Sports to be an analyst and on-course reporter in the 2021 season, while continuing to compete.

Childhood and family life
Born in Tampa, Florida, to Mike Pressel and Kathy Krickstein Pressel, she attended Banyan Creek Elementary School, Omni Middle School, and graduated in 2006 from the Saint Andrew's School in Boca Raton, a private school affiliated with the Episcopal Church. She has stated that her Jewish faith plays a large role in her life.

Following her mother's death from breast cancer in September 2003, 15-year-old Pressel moved in with her maternal grandparents, Evelyn and Herb Krickstein, at St. Andrews Country Club in Boca Raton, Florida. Her two younger siblings stayed with their father. Her grandfather, a retired physician and pathologist, is also her coach. The Kricksteins' son and Pressel's uncle is former professional tennis player Aaron Krickstein.

Pressel's younger sister Madison played collegiate golf for the University of Texas and won on the Symetra Tour in 2014.

In January 2013, Pressel married Andy Bush, a senior vice president at Octagon Global Events. The two met at a pro-am event in 2007.

Amateur career
In 2001, as a 12-year-old, she became the youngest player to qualify for the U.S. Women's Open. This record stood until 2007, when Lexi Thompson beat the record by several months.

At the age of 17, she was one of three co-leaders starting the final round of the 2005 U.S. Women's Open at Cherry Hills in suburban Denver. Pressel was tied for first on the 18th fairway when Birdie Kim holed out from the bunker just ahead to secure a one-stroke lead. Pressel then needed a birdie to tie, but made a bogey on the 18th to lose by two strokes.  Her second-place finish gave her a share of the low amateur honors with Brittany Lang.  Pressel played in a total of seven LPGA events in 2005 and made the cut in all of them, with a scoring average of 70.96 in 28 rounds.

In 2005, Pressel lost to Yani Tseng at 39th hole during the North and South Women's Amateur at Pinehurst, but won the most important amateur event, the U.S. Women's Amateur.  Pressel also finished her amateur career as 2005 Girls Rolex Junior Player of the Year.

During her amateur career, she won 10 AJGA titles, including all five AJGA Invitationals: the "AJGA Slam".
 
 2002 round of 16, U.S. Girls' Junior
 2002 Junior Solheim Cup Team
 2004 quarterfinalist, U.S. Women's Amateur
 2004 quarterfinalist, round of 16, U.S. Girls' Junior
 2004 Won – North and South Women's Amateur
 2005 Won – U.S. Women's Amateur
 2005 2nd place – North and South Amateur
 2005 Girls Rolex Junior Player of the Year
 2005 round of 16, U.S. Girls' Junior
 2005 Junior Solheim Cup Team

Professional career

Pressel finished sixth in the first stage of the LPGA Qualifying Tournament in September 2005 and advanced to the final stage in December. She turned professional in November, after appealing to the LPGA to become a member as a 17-year-old.  LPGA rules state that members must be 18 years old. At the five-round Final Qualifying Tournament in Daytona Beach, she finished tied for sixth to earn her tour card for 2006. She played part-time on the tour until her high school graduation in May 2006.

On her flight home to Florida after her win, Pressel had her golf clubs stolen. The win moved her from 17th in the world rankings to fourth.

Pressel made her first hole-in-one as a professional golfer on July 15, 2007, at the Jamie Farr Owens Corning Classic at Highland Meadows Golf Club in Sylvania, Ohio.  It was a  par 3 – hole 6 for the tournament.  It was not enough to win, though; Se Ri Pak won the event for the fifth time.

Pressel qualified for the 2007, 2009 and 2011 Solheim Cup teams; earning a spot on the 2007 team in her second full-year on the LPGA Tour as a 19-year-old.  Through 2011, she was undefeated (3–0–0) in Solheim Cup singles play.

In the 2012 Sybase Match Play Championship, Pressel was in contention for her third LPGA Tour victory in the semi-finals when she was 2 up after 11 holes to opponent Azahara Muñoz. Pressel won the 12th hole but a slow play penalty resulted in the loss of the hole instead. She would lose the match and Muñoz went on to win the tournament.

On April 26, 2015, Pressel came in second at the Swinging Skirts LPGA Classic in San Francisco. She and Lydia Ko finished at 8-under-par 280 with Ko making a birdie on the par-5 closing hole while Pressel missed a birdie effort to end the tournament. Ko won on the second playoff hole. Pressel's last victory was in 2008 at the Kapalua LPGA Classic.

She is represented by Wasserman Media Group and has endorsement deals with Callaway Golf, Polo Ralph Lauren, Royal Bank of Canada, and Audemars Piguet.

Professional wins (4)

LPGA Tour wins (2) 

LPGA Tour playoff record (0–2)

LPGA of Japan Tour wins (1)
2010 (1) World Ladies Championship Salonpas Cup

Other wins (1)
2012 (1) CVS Caremark Charity Classic (with Jay Haas), unofficial event

Major championships

Wins (1)

Results timeline
Results not in chronological order before 2019.

^ The Evian Championship was added as a major in 2013

LA = Low amateur
CUT = missed the half-way cut
WD = withdrew
NT = no tournament
T = tied

Summary

Most consecutive cuts made – 12 (2009 U.S. Open – 2012 LPGA)
Longest streak of top-10s – 3 (2015 ANA – 2015 U.S. Open)

LPGA Tour career summary

^ Official through 2021 season.
*Includes matchplay and other tournaments without a cut.

World ranking
Position in Women's World Golf Rankings at the end of each calendar year.

Pressel's career-high in the world rankings is fourth, in the spring of 2007.

Team appearances
Amateur
Junior Solheim Cup (representing the United States): 2002 (winners), 2005 (winners)

Professional
Solheim Cup (representing the United States): 2007 (winners), 2009 (winners), 2011, 2013, 2015 (winners), 2019
Lexus Cup (representing International team): 2006, 2007

Solheim Cup record

See also
List of Jewish golfers

References

External links

Morgan's Yahoo Group
Newslib.com feed of articles about Morgan Pressel
MorganPressel.org
Swing Sequence
South Florida Sun-Sentinel – photo gallery: Morgan Pressel through the years

American female golfers
LPGA Tour golfers
Winners of ladies' major amateur golf championships
Winners of LPGA major golf championships
Solheim Cup competitors for the United States
Jewish golfers
Golfers from Tampa, Florida
Jewish American sportspeople
Sportspeople from Boca Raton, Florida
1988 births
Living people
21st-century American Jews
21st-century American women
20th-century American women